Atlantis is the first studio album by the Swiss Symphonic metal band Lunatica, released in 2001.

Track listing

Lunatica albums
2001 debut albums
Frontiers Records albums